The New York Times Book Review (NYTBR) is a weekly paper-magazine supplement to the Sunday edition of The New York Times in which current non-fiction and fiction books are reviewed. It is one of the most influential and widely read book review publications in the industry. The offices are located near Times Square in New York City.

Overview

The New York Times has published a book review section since October 10, 1896, announcing: "We begin today the publication of a Supplement which contains reviews of new books ... and other interesting matter ... associated with news of the day." In 1911, the review was moved to Sundays, on the theory that it would be more appreciatively received by readers with a bit of time on their hands.

The target audience is an intelligent, general-interest adult reader. The Times publishes two versions each week, one with a cover price sold via subscription, bookstores and newsstands; the other with no cover price included as an insert in each Sunday edition of the Times (the copies are otherwise identical).

Each week the NYTBR receives 750 to 1000 books from authors and publishers in the mail, of which 20 to 30 are chosen for review. Books are selected by the "preview editors" who read over 1,500 advance galleys a year. The selection process is based on finding books that are important and notable, as well as discovering new authors whose books stand above the crowd. Self-published books are generally not reviewed as a matter of policy. Books not selected for review are stored in a "discard room" and then sold. , Barnes & Noble arrived about once a month to purchase the contents of the discard room, and the proceeds are then donated by NYTBR to charities. Books that are actually reviewed are usually donated to the reviewer.

As of 2015, all review critics are freelance; the NYTBR does not have staff critics. In prior years, the NYTBR did have in-house critics, or a mix of in-house and freelance. For freelance critics, they are assigned an in-house "preview editor" who works with them in creating the final review. Freelance critics might be employees of The New York Times whose main duties are in other departments. They also include professional literary critics, novelists, academics and artists who write reviews for the NYTBR on a regular basis.

Other duties on staff include a number of senior editors and a chief editor; a team of copy editors; a letter pages editor who reads letters to the editor; columnists who write weekly columns, such as the "Paperback Row" column; a production editor; a web and Internet publishing division; and other jobs. In addition to the magazine there is an Internet site that offers additional content, including audio interviews with authors, called the "Book Review Podcast".

The book review publishes each week the widely cited and influential New York Times Best Seller list, which is created by the editors of the Times "News Surveys" department.

In 2021, on the 125th anniversary of the Book Review, Parul Sehgal a staff critic and former editor at the Book Review, wrote a review of the NYTBR titled "Reviewing the Book Review".

Pamela Paul was editor from 2013 to 2022, succeeding Sam Tanenhaus, who was editor from 2004 to 2013.

Podcast 
"Inside The New York Times Book Review" is the oldest and most popular podcast at The New York Times. The debut episode was released on April 30, 2006 and the show has been recorded weekly ever since.

1983 Legion court case
In 1983, William Peter Blatty sued the New York Times Book Review for failing to include his 1983 novel, Legion, in its best-seller list. The New York Times had previously claimed that it based its "best-seller list" is based on computer-processed sales figures from 2,000 bookstores across the United States. Blatty contended that Legion had sold enough copies to be included on the list. Lawyers for The New York Times did not deny this, but stated that the content of the New York Times best-seller list is editorial in content, and is not an objective compilation of information. The court ruled in favor of The New York Times.

Best Books of the Year and Notable Books 
Each year since 1968, around the beginning of December, a list of notable books and/or editor's choice ("Best Books") is announced. Beginning in 2004, it consists of a "100 Notable Books of the Year" list which contains fiction and non-fiction titles, 50 of each. From the list of 100, 10 books are awarded the "Best Books of the Year" title, five each of fiction and non-fiction. Other year-end lists include the Best Illustrated Children's Books, in which 10 books are chosen by a panel of judges.

1990s 

1998

The Notable Books were announced December 6, 1998. The eleven Editor's Choice books were announced December 6, 1998.

 Lorrie Moore, Birds of America
 Russell Banks, Cloudsplitter
 Richard Fortey, Life: A Natural History of the First Four Billion Years of Life on Earth
 Alice Munro, The Love of a Good Woman
 Barbara Kingsolver, The Poisonwood Bible
 David Gates, Preston Falls
 Ron Chernow, Titan: The Life of John D. Rockefeller, Sr.
 Richard Holbrooke, To End a War
 Hilary Spurling, The Unknown Matisse
 Graham Robb, Victor Hugo: A Biography
 Philip Gourevitch, We Wish to Inform You That Tomorrow We Will be Killed With Our Families: Stories from Rwanda

1999

The Notable Books were announced December 5, 1999. The eleven Editor's Choice books were announced December 5, 1999.

 Richard A. Posner, An Affair of State: The Investigation, Impeachment, and Trial of President Clinton
 Annie Proulx, Close Range: Wyoming Stories
 Richard Holmes, Coleridge: Darker Reflections, 1804-1834
 J. M. Coetzee, Disgrace
 Antonio Damasio, The Feeling of What Happens: Body and Emotion in the Making of Consciousness
 John Keegan, The First World War
 Michael Frayn, Headlong
 Jean Strouse, Morgan: American Financier
 Inga Clendinnen, Reading the Holocaust
 Judith Thurman, Secrets of the Flesh: A Life of Colette
 Roddy Doyle, A Star Called Henry

2000s 

2000

The Notable Books were announced December 3, 2000. The 10 Editor's Choice books were announced December 3, 2000.

 Jim Crace, Being Dead
 Unknown, Beowulf (translation by Seamus Heaney)
 Matt Ridley, Genome: The Autobiography of a Species in 23 Chapters
 John Updike, Gertrude and Claudius
 Dave Eggers, A Heartbreaking Work Of Staggering Genius: A Memoir Based on a True Story
 Philip Roth, The Human Stain
 Tom Segev, One Palestine, Complete: Jews and Arabs Under the British Mandate
 Graham Robb, Rimbaud: A Biography
 Frances FitzGerald, Way Out There In the Blue: Reagan, Star Wars and the End of the Cold War

2001

The Notable Books were announced December 2, 2001. The 9 Editor's Choice books were announced December 2, 2001.

 W.G. Sebald, Austerlitz
 Paula Fox, Borrowed Finery: A Memoir
 Jonathan Franzen, The Corrections
 Alice Munro, Hateship, Friendship, Courtship, Loveship, Marriage
 Colson Whitehead, John Henry Days
 Louis Menand, The Metaphysical Club: A Story of Ideas in America
 Peter Carey, True History of the Kelly Gang
 Oliver Sacks, Uncle Tungsten: Memories of a Chemical Boyhood

2002

The Notable Books were announced December 8, 2002. The 7 Editor's Choice books were announced December 8, 2002.

 Miranda Carter, Anthony Blunt: His Lives
 Ian McEwan, Atonement
 Lorna Sage, Bad Blood
 Jeffrey Eugenides, Middlesex
 Margaret MacMillan, Paris 1919: Six Months That Changed the World
 William Kennedy, Roscoe
 Timothy Ferris, Seeing in the Dark: How Backyard Stargazers Are Probing Deep Space and Guarding Earth from Interplanetary Peril

2003

The Notable Books were announced December 7, 2003. The 9 Editor's Choice books were announced December 7, 2003.

 Caroline Alexander, The Bounty: The True Story of the Mutiny on the Bounty
 Monica Ali, Brick Lane
 T. Coraghessan Boyle, Drop City
 Jonathan Lethem, The Fortress of Solitude
 William Taubman, Khrushchev: The Man and His Era
 Edward P. Jones, The Known World
 Gabriel García Márquez, Living to Tell the Tale
 Adrian Nicole LeBlanc, Random Family: Love, Drugs, Trouble, and Coming of Age in the Bronx

2004

The 100 Notable Books were announced December 5, 2004. The 10 Best Books were announced December 12, 2004.

 Ron Chernow, Alexander Hamilton
 Bob Dylan, Chronicles: Volume One
 David Hackett Fischer, Washington's Crossing
 Stephen Greenblatt, Will in the World: How Shakespeare Became Shakespeare
 Ha Jin, War Trash
 Alice Munro, Runaway
 Orhan Pamuk, Snow
 Marilynne Robinson, Gilead
 Philip Roth, The Plot Against America
 Colm Tóibín, The Master

2005

The 100 Notable Books were announced December 4, 2005. The 10 Best Books were announced December 11, 2005.

 Joan Didion, The Year of Magical Thinking
 Mary Gaitskill, Veronica
 Jonathan Harr, The Lost Painting: The Quest for a Caravaggio Masterpiece
 Tony Judt, Postwar: A History of Europe Since 1945
 Ian McEwan, Saturday
 Haruki Murakami, Kafka on the Shore
 George Packer, The Assassins' Gate: America in Iraq
 Curtis Sittenfeld, Prep
 Zadie Smith, On Beauty
 Mark Stevens and Annalyn Swan, de Kooning: An American Master

2006

The 100 Notable Books were announced December 3, 2006. The 10 Best Books were announced December 10, 2006.

 Richard Ford, The Lay of the Land
 Amy Hempel, The Collected Stories of Amy Hempel
 Claire Messud, The Emperor's Children
 Marisha Pessl, Special Topics in Calamity Physics
 Nathaniel Philbrick, Mayflower: A Story of Courage, Community, and War
 Michael Pollan, The Omnivore's Dilemma: A Natural History of Four Meals
 Gary Shteyngart, Absurdistan
 Rory Stewart, The Places In Between
 Danielle Trussoni, Falling Through the Earth: A Memoir
 Lawrence Wright, The Looming Tower: Al-Qaeda and the Road to 9/11

2007

The 100 Notable Books were announced December 2, 2007. The 10 Best Books were announced December 9, 2007.

 Roberto Bolaño, The Savage Detectives
 Rajiv Chandrasekaran, Imperial Life in the Emerald City: Inside Iraq's Green Zone
 Linda Colley, The Ordeal of Elizabeth Marsh: A Woman in World History
 Joshua Ferris, Then We Came to the End
 Denis Johnson, Tree of Smoke: A Novel
 Mildred Armstrong Kalish, Little Heathens
 Per Petterson, Out Stealing Horses
 Alex Ross, The Rest Is Noise: Listening to the Twentieth Century
 Michael Thomas, Man Gone Down: A Novel
 Jeffrey Toobin, The Nine: Inside the Secret World of the Supreme Court

2008

The 100 Notable Books were announced November 26, 2008.  The 10 Best Books were announced December 14, 2008.

 Julian Barnes, Nothing to Be Frightened Of
 Roberto Bolaño, 2666
 Drew Gilpin Faust, This Republic of Suffering: Death and the American Civil War
 Dexter Filkins, The Forever War
 Patrick French, The World Is What It Is: The Authorized Biography of V. S. Naipaul
 Jhumpa Lahiri, Unaccustomed Earth
 Jane Mayer, The Dark Side: The Inside Story of How The War on Terror Turned into a War on American Ideals
 Steven Millhauser, Dangerous Laughter: Thirteen Stories
 Toni Morrison, A Mercy
 Joseph O'Neill, Netherland

2009

The 100 Notable Books were announced December 6, 2009. The 10 Best Books were announced December 13, 2009.

 Liaquat Ahamed, Lords of Finance: The Bankers Who Broke the World
 David Finkel, The Good Soldiers
 Richard Holmes, The Age of Wonder: How the Romantic Generation Discovered the Beauty and Terror of Science
 Mary Karr, Lit: A Memoir
 Jonathan Lethem, Chronic City
 Maile Meloy, Both Ways Is the Only Way I Want It
 Lorrie Moore, A Gate at the Stairs
 Carol Sklenicka, Raymond Carver: A Writer's Life
 Kate Walbert, A Short History of Women
 Jeannette Walls, Half Broke Horses

2010s 

2010

The 100 Notable Books were announced November 24, 2010. The 10 Best Books were announced December 1, 2010.

 Ann Beattie, The New Yorker Stories
 Emma Donoghue, Room
 Jennifer Egan, A Visit from the Goon Squad
 Jonathan Franzen, Freedom
 Jennifer Homans, Apollo's Angels: A History of Ballet
 Siddhartha Mukherjee, The Emperor of All Maladies: A Biography of Cancer
 Stacy Schiff, Cleopatra: A Life
 Stephen Sondheim, Finishing the Hat
 William Trevor, Selected Stories
 Isabel Wilkerson, The Warmth of Other Suns: The Epic Story of America's Great Migration

2011

The 100 Notable Books were announced November 21, 2011. The 10 Best Books were announced November 30, 2011.

 Ian Brown, The Boy in the Moon: A Father's Journey to Understand His Extraordinary Son
 Amanda Foreman, A World on Fire: Britain's Crucial Role in the American Civil War
 Chad Harbach, The Art of Fielding
 Eleanor Henderson, Ten Thousand Saints
 Christopher Hitchens, Arguably: Essays
 Daniel Kahneman, Thinking, Fast and Slow
 Stephen King, 11/22/63
 Manning Marable, Malcolm X: A Life of Reinvention
 Téa Obreht, The Tiger's Wife
 Karen Russell, Swamplandia!

2012

The 100 Notable Books were announced November 27, 2012. The 10 Best Books were announced November 30, 2012.

 Katherine Boo, Behind the Beautiful Forevers: Life, Death, and Hope in a Mumbai Undercity
 Robert Caro, The Passage of Power
 Dave Eggers, A Hologram for the King
 Jim Holt, Why Does the World Exist?: An Existential Detective Story
 Hilary Mantel, Bring Up the Bodies
 David Nasaw, The Patriarch: The Remarkable Life and Turbulent Times of Joseph P. Kennedy
 Kevin Powers, The Yellow Birds
 Andrew Solomon, Far From the Tree: Parents, Children and the Search for Identity
 Zadie Smith, NW
 Chris Ware, Building Stories

2013

The 100 Notable Books were announced November 27, 2013. The 10 Best Books were announced December 4, 2013.

 Chimamanda Ngozi Adichie, Americanah
 Kate Atkinson, Life After Life
 Peter Baker, Days of Fire: Bush and Cheney in the White House
 Alan S. Blinder, After the Music Stopped: The Financial Crisis, the Response, and the Work Ahead
 Christopher Clark, The Sleepwalkers: How Europe Went to War in 1914
 Sonali Deraniyagala, Wave
 Sheri Fink, Five Days at Memorial: Life and Death in a Storm-Ravaged Hospital
 Rachel Kushner, The Flamethrowers
 Donna Tartt, The Goldfinch
 George Saunders, Tenth of December: Stories

2014

The 100 Notable Books were announced. The 10 Best Books were announced December 14, 2014.

 Eula Biss, On Immunity: An Inoculation
 Roz Chast, Can't We Talk about Something More Pleasant?: A Memoir
 Anthony Doerr, All the Light We Cannot See
 Lily King, Euphoria
 Phil Klay, Redeployment
 Elizabeth Kolbert, The Sixth Extinction: An Unnatural History
 Hermione Lee, Penelope Fitzgerald: A Life
 Jenny Offill, Dept. of Speculation
 Akhil Sharma, Family Life
 Lawrence Wright, Thirteen Days in September: Carter, Begin, and Sadat at Camp

2015
 
The 100 Notable Books were announced November 27, 2015. The 10 Best Books were announced December 3, 2015.

 Paul Beatty, The Sellout
 Sven Beckert, Empire of Cotton: A Global History
 Lucia Berlin, A Manual for Cleaning Women: Selected Stories
 Ta-Nehisi Coates, Between the World and Me
 Rachel Cusk, Outline
 Elena Ferrante, The Story of the Lost Child: Book 4, The Neapolitan Novels: “Maturity, Old Age”
 Helen Macdonald, H Is for Hawk
 Åsne Seierstad, One of Us: The Story of Anders Breivik and the Massacre in Norway
 Magda Szabó, The Door
 Andrea Wulf, The Invention of Nature: Alexander von Humboldt's New World

2016

The 100 Notable Books were announced November 23, 2016. The 10 Best Books were announced December 1, 2016.

 Sarah Bakewell, At the Existentialist Café: Freedom, Being, and Apricot Cocktails
 Matthew Desmond, Evicted: Poverty and Profit in the American City
 Susan Faludi, In the Darkroom
 Stefan Hertmans, War and Turpentine
 Han Kang, The Vegetarian
 Karan Mahajan, The Association of Small Bombs
 Hisham Matar, The Return: Fathers, Sons and the Land in Between
 Jane Mayer, Dark Money: The Hidden History of the Billionaires Behind the Rise of the Radical Right
 Ian McGuire, The North Water
 Colson Whitehead, The Underground Railroad

2017

The 100 Notable Books were announced November 22, 2017. The 10 Best Books were announced November 30, 2017.

 Naomi Alderman, The Power
 Ron Chernow, Grant
 James Forman Jr., Locking Up Our Own: Crime and Punishment in Black America
 Caroline Fraser, Prairie Fires: The American Dreams of Laura Ingalls Wilder
 Mohsin Hamid, Exit West
 Min Jin Lee, Pachinko
 Patricia Lockwood, Priestdaddy: A Memoir
 Richard Prum, The Evolution of Beauty: How Darwin’s Forgotten Theory of Mate Choice Shapes the Animal World — and Us
 Ali Smith, Autumn
 Jesmyn Ward, Sing, Unburied, Sing

2018

The 100 Notable Books were announced November 18, 2018. The 10 Best Books were announced November 29, 2018.

 Shane Bauer, American Prison: A Reporter's Undercover Journey into the Business of Punishment
 Lisa Brennan-Jobs, Small Fry
 David W. Blight, Frederick Douglass: Prophet of Freedom
 Esi Edugyan, Washington Black
 Lisa Halliday, Asymmetry
 Rebecca Makkai, The Great Believers
 Tommy Orange, There There
 Michael Pollan, How to Change Your Mind: What the New Science of Psychedelics Teaches Us About Consciousness, Dying, Addiction, Depression, and Transcendence
 Leïla Slimani, Lullaby
 Tara Westover, Educated

2019

The 100 Notable Books were announced November 25, 2019. The 10 Best Books were announced November 22, 2019. In 2019 for the first time, the 10 Best Books were announced prior to the 100 Notable Books.

 Kevin Barry, Night Boat to Tangier
 Sarah M. Broom, The Yellow House
 Leo Damrosch, The Club: Johnson, Boswell, and the Friends Who Shaped an Age
 Ted Chiang, Exhalation: Stories
 Adam Higginbotham, Midnight in Chernobyl: The Untold Story of the World's Greatest Nuclear Disaster
 Patrick Radden Keefe, Say Nothing: A True Story of Murder and Memory in Northern Ireland
 Ben Lerner, The Topeka School
 Valeria Luiselli, Lost Children Archive
 Julia Phillips, Disappearing Earth
 Rachel Louise Snyder, No Visible Bruises: What We Don’t Know About Domestic Violence Can Kill Us

2020s 

2020

The 100 Notable Books were announced November 20, 2020. The 10 Best Books were announced November 23, 2020.

Fiction

 Lydia Millet, A Children's Bible
 James McBride, Deacon King Kong
 Maggie O'Farrell, Hamnet
 Ayad Akhtar, Homeland Elegies
 Brit Bennett, The Vanishing Half
 Victoria Chang, "Obit"

Nonfiction

 Robert Kolker, Hidden Valley Road
 Barack Obama, A Promised Land
 James Shapiro, Shakespeare in a Divided America
 Anna Wiener, Uncanny Valley
 Margaret MacMillan, War: How Conflict Shaped Us

2021

The 100 Notable Books were announced November 22, 2021. The 10 Best Books were announced November 30, 2021.

Fiction

 Imbolo Mbue, How Beautiful We Were
 Katie Kitamura, Intimacies
 Honorée Fanonne Jeffers, The Love Songs of W.E.B. Du Bois
 Patricia Lockwood, No One Is Talking About This
 Benjamín Labatut, When We Cease to Understand the World

Nonfiction

 Tove Ditlevsen, The Copenhagen Trilogy
 Clint Smith, How the Word is Passed
 Andrea Elliott, Invisible Child: Poverty, Survival and Hope in an American City
 Annette Gordon-Reed, On Juneteenth
 Heather Clark, Red Comet: The Short Life and Blazing Art of Sylvia Plath

2022

The 100 Notable Books were announced November 22, 2022. The 10 Best Books were announced November 29, 2022.

Fiction

 Jennifer Egan, The Candy House
 Claire-Louise Bennett, Checkout 19
 Barbara Kingsolver, Demon Copperhead
 Namwali Serpell, The Furrows
 Hernan Diaz, Trust

Nonfiction

 Ed Yong, An Immense World: How Animal Senses Reveal the Hidden Realms Around Us
 Hua Hsu, Stay True: A Memoir
 Rachel Aviv, Strangers to Ourselves: Unsettled Minds and the Stories That Make Us
 Linda Villarosa, Under the Skin: The Hidden Toll of Racism on American Lives and on the Health of Our Nation
 Fintan O'Toole, We Don't Know Ourselves: a Personal History of Modern Ireland

Studies
In 2010, Stanford professors Alan Sorenson and Jonah Berger published a study examining the effect on book sales from positive or negative reviews in the New York Times Book Review. They found all books benefited from positive reviews, while popular or well-known authors were negatively impacted by negative reviews. Lesser-known authors benefited from negative reviews; in other words, bad publicity actually boosted book sales.

A study published in 2012, by university professor and author Roxane Gay, found that 90 percent of the New York Times book reviews published in 2011 were of books by white authors. Gay said, "The numbers reflect the overall trend in publishing where the majority of books published are written by white writers." At the time of the report, the racial makeup of the United States was 72 percent white, according to the 2010 census (it includes Hispanic and Latino Americans who identify as white).

See also
 Books in the United States

References

External links
, home page.
The New York Times, October 10, 1896. Inaugural book review issue (announced on page 4, column 1)
Interviews with senior editors and writers at the NYTBR, by Michael Orbach, The Knight News, Issue date: 2/8/07 Section: Knight Life
The Man Behind the Criticism: Sam Tanenhaus (via Wayback Machine)
Question and Answer: Dwight Garner (via Wayback Machine)
Question and Answer: Liesl Schillinger (via Wayback Machine)
Question and Answer: Rachel Donadio (via Wayback Machine)
"Are The New York Times Book Reviews Fair?", Tell Me More, National Public Radio, August 20, 2010 
"Secret Workings Of Times Book Review Exposed!", Choir, February 24, 2007
How The New York Times Book Review Chooses Its Reviewers
10 Things You Didn’t Know About How the NY Times Book Review Works
Answering the Most Frequent Questions About the Book Review

Weekly magazines published in the United States
Book review magazines
Magazines established in 1896
Magazines published in New York City
The New York Times
Newspaper supplements